LawCareers.Net is a website published in association with the Law Society and the Bar Council, and sponsored by BPP Law School. It contains core editorial, news and features, advice, immediate vacancies, an events diary, and directories of law firms, chambers and undergraduate and postgraduate law course providers.

LawCareers.Net also hosts the annual Training & Recruitment Awards. The awards recognise excellence in training and recruitment in the profession, with winning firms selected from the results of a survey completed by more than 2,000 trainee and newly qualified solicitors.

The Training Contract & Pupillage Handbook is LawCareers.Net's sister publication. LawCareers.Net and The Training Contract & Pupillage Handbook are published by Globe Business Publishing, an independent specialist legal publisher based in London, United Kingdom.

In 2015, LawCareers.Net introduced a Vloggers section to their YouTube page which features Coleen Mensa of “The Legal Diaries” and Clare Taylor of “ClairesVlawgs”.

See also
 Law firms
 barristers' chambers

References

External links
 LawCareers.net
 

Legal websites